Kate Elizabeth McShea (born 13 April 1983) is an Australian soccer player, who played for Queensland Roar in the Australian W-League.

Honours
With Brisbane Roar:
 W-League Premiership: 2008–09
 W-League Championship: 2008–09

References

External links
 Football Australia Profile

1983 births
Living people
Australian women's soccer players
Brisbane Roar FC (A-League Women) players
A-League Women players
Olympic soccer players of Australia
Footballers at the 2000 Summer Olympics
2007 FIFA Women's World Cup players
Australia women's international soccer players
Women's association football defenders